Pleurodema borellii (common name: rufous four-eyed frog) is a species of frog in the family Leptodactylidae. It is found in northwestern Argentina and southern Bolivia. The taxonomic status of this species is uncertain, and it may be a junior synonym of Pleurodema cinerea. It is abundant in Argentina, occurring in the Chaco-Yungas transition and montane grasslands on the eastern slopes of the Andes. Reproduction takes place in small permanent and temporary pools where pairs build floating foam nests. It is also found in disturbed habitats, including urban areas. No major threats to this species have been identified.

References

Pleurodema
Amphibians of the Andes
Amphibians of Argentina
Amphibians of Bolivia
Taxa named by Mario Giacinto Peracca
Amphibians described in 1895
Taxonomy articles created by Polbot